Claude Issorat (born 7 February 1966, in Pointe-à-Pitre, Guadeloupe) is a Paralympian track and field athlete from France competing mainly in category T54 wheelchair racing sprint events.

Issorat is one of the most successful French track and field Paralympians with 13 medals, 7 gold, across 4 games.  He has medalled in events ranging from 100 m up to marathon.

References
 profile on paralympic.org

External links 
 
 

Living people
1966 births
Paralympic athletes of France
Athletes (track and field) at the 1992 Summer Paralympics
Athletes (track and field) at the 1996 Summer Paralympics
Athletes (track and field) at the 2000 Summer Paralympics
Athletes (track and field) at the 2004 Summer Paralympics
Paralympic gold medalists for France
Paralympic silver medalists for France
Paralympic bronze medalists for France
Wheelchair racers at the 1992 Summer Olympics
Wheelchair racers at the 1996 Summer Olympics
Wheelchair racers at the 2000 Summer Olympics
French male wheelchair racers
People from Pointe-à-Pitre
Guadeloupean athletes
Paralympic wheelchair racers
Medalists at the 1992 Summer Paralympics
Medalists at the 1996 Summer Paralympics
Medalists at the 2000 Summer Paralympics
Medalists at the 2004 Summer Paralympics
Paralympic medalists in athletics (track and field)